Reinventing Discovery: The New Era of Networked Science is a book written by Michael Nielsen and released in October 2011. It argues for the benefits of applying the philosophy of open science to research.

Summary
The following is a list of major topics in the book's chapters.

Reinventing Discovery
Online Tools Make Us Smarter
Kasparov versus the World, The Wisdom of Crowds, various online collaborative projects
Restructuring Expert Attention
InnoCentive, collective intelligence, Paul Seabright's economic theory, online chat
Patterns of Online Collaboration
History of Linux, Open Architecture Network, Wikipedia, MathWorks' computer programming contest
The Limits and the Potential of Collective Intelligence
communication in small groups, particularly as studied by Stasser and Titus; praxis of science; a discussion of communication among scientists
All the World's Knowledge
Don R. Swanson and Literature-based discovery, predicting influenza with Google searches, Sloan Digital Sky Survey, Allen Institute for Brain Science, Ocean Observatories Initiative, Human Genome Project, Google Translate, playchess.com Tournaments
Democratizing Science
Galaxy Zoo, Foldit, citizen science, eBird, open access, arXiv, PLoS
The Challenge of Doing Science in the Open
Complexity Zoo, academic publishing, Bayh–Dole Act
The Open Science Imperative
Open science, academic journal publishing reform, SPIRES
appendix - The problem solved by the Polymath Project

Reviews
Timo Hannay's review in Nature said that in this book Nielsen gives "the most compelling and comprehensive case so far for a new approach to science in the Internet age".

The Financial Times review said that the book was "the most compelling manifesto yet for the transformative power of networked science".

References

External links

Interview in Citizen Science Quarterly

Open science
Books about the history of science
2011 non-fiction books
Princeton University Press books